The Happy Valley Racecourse fire took place on 26 February 1918 in the Happy Valley Racecourse located at Happy Valley, British Hong Kong. The catastrophe caused the loss of 614 lives. In mainland Chinese sources, this is often included in the top ten fires in 20th-century China.

Background

The racecourse was first built in 1845 to provide horse racing for the British people in Hong Kong. The area was previously swampland, but the only flat ground suitable for horse racing on Hong Kong Island. To make way for the racecourse, the Hong Kong government prohibited rice growing by villages in the surrounding area. The first race ran in December 1846. Over the years, horse racing became more and more popular among Chinese residents.

Fire

The annual "Derby Day" race was held every February. To accommodate the extra spectators a temporary grandstand was built. The fire was caused by the collapse of a temporary grandstand on the second day of the event. The collapse knocked over food stalls which set bamboo matting ablaze. The district’s fire department was so stretched that the marine police were called up to help fight the fire. By the next day, as many as 576 confirmed deaths were reported by the Hongkong Telegraph.

Aftermath
Most of the dead bodies became unrecognisable and assumed to be "Chinese". 614 bodies were officially recovered. In mainland Chinese sources, this is often included in the top ten fires in 20th century China.

The nearby Tung Wah Hospital was one of the first to offer assistance and after the fire arranged for labourers to collect the dead. They were buried in the nearby So Kon Po area (now the site of Hong Kong Stadium). A Chinese-styled memorial site known as Race Course Fire Memorial was built in the Chinese cemetery (now behind the east stand of the stadium) in 1922 in So Kon Po. It was declared a monument in 2015.

See also
List of fires in China
List of building or structure fires

Bibliography 
Notes

References 

 - Total pages: 383  

 - Total pages: 236 

Horse racing venues in Hong Kong 
Tourist attractions in Hong Kong
Fires in Hong Kong
1918 in Hong Kong
1918 fires in Asia
Happy Valley, Hong Kong
February 1918 events
Stadium disasters
Man-made disasters in Hong Kong 
Accidental deaths in Hong Kong
Fire disasters involving barricaded escape routes
Sports venue fires